The Palestinian enclaves are areas in the West Bank designated for Palestinians under a variety of U.S. and Israeli-led proposals to end the Israeli–Palestinian conflict. The enclaves are often compared to the nominally self-governing black homelands created in apartheid-era South Africa, and are therefore referred to as bantustans. They have been referred to figuratively as the Palestinian archipelago, among other terms.

The "islands" first took official form as Areas A and B under the 1995 Oslo II Accord. This arrangement was explicitly intended to be temporary with Area C (the rest of the West Bank) to "be gradually transferred to Palestinian jurisdiction" by 1997; however, no such transfers were made. The area of the West Bank currently under partial civil control of the Palestinian National Authority is composed of 165 "islands". The creation of this arrangement has been described by Israeli journalist Amira Hass as "the most outstanding geopolitical occurrence of the past quarter century."

A number of Israeli-U.S. peace plans, including the Allon Plan, the Drobles World Zionist Organization plan, Menachem Begin's plan, Benjamin Netanyahu's "Allon Plus" plan, the 2000 Camp David Summit, and Sharon's vision of a Palestinian state have proposed an enclave-type territory – i.e. a group of non-contiguous areas surrounded, divided, and, ultimately, controlled by Israel; as has the more recent Trump peace plan. This has been referred to as the "Bantustan option".

The consequences of the creation of these fragmented Palestinian areas has been studied widely, and has been shown to have had a "devastating impact on the economy, social networks, the provision of basic services such as healthcare and education".

Names

Enclaves, cantons or archipelago
A variety of terms are used by Palestinians and outside observers to describe these spaces, including "enclaves," "cantons," "open-air prisons", reservations or, collectively, as a "ghetto state" while "islands" or "archipelago" is considered to communicate how the infrastructure of the Israeli occupation of the West Bank has disrupted contiguity between Palestinian areas. "Swiss cheese" is another popular analogy. Of these terms, "enclaves", "cantons" and archipelago have also been applied to the pattern of Jewish settlements in the West Bank. The Encyclopedia of the Israeli–Palestinian Conflict entry for "Bantustan" says that they also are called "cantons or enclaves" and makes use of the word "fragmentation" in its analysis as of 2006.

The process of creating the fragmented enclaves has also been described as "encystation" by international relations scholar Glenn Bowman and as "enclavization" by geographer Ghazi Falah. According to a report commissioned for the United Nations Development Programme (UNDP), Israel has systematically segregated Palestinians communities into a series of archipelagos (referred to variously as isolated islands, enclaves, cantons, and Bantustans) under an arrangement referred to as 'one of the most intensively territorialized control systems ever created'.

Bantustans
The enclaves are often referred to as "bantustans", particularly but not exclusively by those critical of Israeli policy towards Palestinians, in reference to the territories set aside for black inhabitants in Apartheid South Africa. The label implies that the areas lack meaningful political sovereignty and economic independence. According to Professor Julie Peteet, Chair of the Department of Anthropology at the University of Louisville, the Israeli government's overall hafrada policy of separation, "exemplified in Jewish settlements, Palestinian enclaves, land expropriation, checkpoints, segregated roads, and the permit system" is a parallel to South African apartheid's pass system, land policies, and Bantustans.

Usage of the term bantustans to describe the Palestinian areas has been traced back to the 1960s including by Israeli military leader and politician Moshe Dayan, who reportedly suggested bantustans as an explicit model for the Palestinian enclaves. Other Israelis and Americans who have used similar terminology in various contexts include Ariel Sharon (reportedly), Colin Powell, James Baker, John Dugard, Martin Indyk, Daniel Levy, Amos Elon, Yigal Allon, I. F. Stone, Avi Primor, Ze'ev Schiff, Meron Benvenisti, Yuval Shany, Menachem Klein, and Akiva Eldar. The verbal noun "bantustanization" was first used by Azmi Bishara in 1995, though Yassir Arafat had made the analogy earlier in peace talks to his interlocutors. Many researchers and writers from the Israeli left used it in the early 2000s, for example with Meron Benvenisti referring in 2004 to the territorial, political and economic fragmentation model being pursued by the Israeli government.

History

Israeli planning in the West Bank before Oslo

After the 1967 Six-Day War, a small group of officers and senior Israeli officials advocated that Israel unilaterally plan for a Palestinian mini-state or "canton", in the north of the West Bank. Policymakers did not implement this cantonal plan at the time. Defense minister Moshe Dayan said that Israel should keep the West Bank and Gaza Strip, arguing that a "sort of Arab 'bantustan' should be created with control of internal affairs, leaving Israel with defence, security and foreign affairs". Just weeks after the war, American Jewish intellectual I. F. Stone wrote that giving the West Bank back to Jordan would be better than creating "a puppet state — a kind of Arab Bantustan".

Allon plan
In early 1968, Yigal Allon, the Israeli minister after whom the 1967 Allon Plan is named, proposed reformulating his plan by transferring some Palestinian areas back to Jordan. According to the plan, Israel would annex most of the Jordan Valley, from the river to the eastern slopes of the West Bank hill ridge, East Jerusalem, and the Etzion bloc while the heavily populated areas of the West Bank hill country, together with a corridor that included Jericho, would be offered to Jordan. Allon's intention was to create a zone deemed necessary for security reasons between Israel and Jordan and set up an "eastern column" of agricultural settlements. The plan would have annexed about 35 percent of the West Bank with few Palestinians.

In Allon's view, if Israel did not give back the Palestinian lands that were not supposed to be annexed for Israeli settlement to that country, it would have to leave Palestinians with an autonomy under Israeli rule. This, he argued, would lead observers to conclude that Israel had set up an arrangement akin to "some kind of South African Bantustan".

1968 Jerusalem plan

The master plan set the objective of ensuring the "unification of Jerusalem" and preventing it from being divided in the future. Pursuant to this and subsequent plans, twelve Israeli settlements were established in such a way as to "complete a belt of built fabric that enveloped and bisected the Palestinian neighborhoods and villages annexed to the city." The plan called for the construction of Jewish neighbourhoods in stages, which started shortly after the Six-Day War. In particular, the new settlements of Ramot Eshkol, French Hill and Givat HaMivtar closed the gap in the northern parts of the city. The second stage took place in the 1970s and early 1980s, when Ramot and Neve Ya'akov in the north and Gilo and East Talpiot in the south were built. The third stage included Pisgat Ze'ev in 1980 and the creation of the "outer security belt", which consisted of Ma'ale Adumim (1977), Givon (1981) and Efrat (1983), built on high ground and next to strategic roads in the Palestinian area. The most recent endeavours included the construction of Har Homa (1991) and the so far unsuccessful attempts to connect Ma'ale Adumim with other Israeli settlements in East Jerusalem.

Drobles and Sharon plans

Ariel Sharon was the primary figure behind Likud's policy for Israeli settlements in the Palestinian territories for decades, and is widely regarded as its main architect. According to Ron Nachman, Sharon had been thinking about the issue of settlement in the conquered territories since 1973, and his map of settlement, outlined in 1978, had not essentially changed by the time he implemented the Separation Barrier.

In September 1977, in the first Likud government, Ariel Sharon took over the Ministerial Committee for Settlement and announced the first in a series of plans for new settlements. This was to be organized via a web of blocks of settlements of different sizes situated on the mountain ridges throughout the West Bank in and around Palestinian cities and villages. Sharon thought the Allon plan insufficient unless the high terrain was also fortified.

Later, Sharon's plans were adopted as the "Master Plan for the Development of Settlement in Judea and Samaria for the Years 1979–1983", authored by Matityahu Drobles on behalf of the Settlement Division of the World Zionist Organization in 1979. In 1982, Sharon, then Minister of Defence, published his master plan for Jewish Settlements in the West Bank Through the Year 2010 which became known as the Sharon Plan.

These plans – the Allon, Drobles and Sharon master plans, as well as the Hundred Thousand plan, which has never been officially acknowledged – were the blueprint for the West Bank Israeli settlements. According to professor Saeed Rahnema, these plans envisaged "the establishment of settlements on the hilltops surrounding Palestinian towns and villages and the creation of as many Palestinian enclaves as possible" while many aspects formed the basis of all the failed "peace plans" that ensued.

The Road to Oslo
According to Avi Primor, the former deputy director-general of Israel's Foreign Ministry's department for Africa, Asia and Oceania, who was an ambassador and vice president of Tel Aviv University at the time of writing in 2002, in the top echelons of the Israeli security establishment in the 1970s and 1980s there was widespread empathy for South Africa's apartheid system and it was particularly interested in that country's resolution of the demographic issue by inventing bantustan "homelands" for various groups of the indigenous black population. Pro-Palestinian circles and scholars, despite the secrecy of the tacit alliance between Israel and South Africa, were familiar with ongoing arrangements between the two in military and nuclear matters, though the thriving cooperation between Israel and the Bophuthatswana Bantustan themselves was a subject that remained neglected until recently, when South Africa's archives began to be opened up.

Autonomy

By the early 1970s, Arabic-language magazines began to compare the Israeli proposals for a Palestinian autonomy to the Bantustan strategy of South Africa, In January 1978, Palestine Liberation Organization (PLO) leader Yasser Arafat criticized a peace offering from Menachem Begin as "less than Bantustans". The September 1978 Camp David accords included provision for the Palestinians, who did not participate, based on Begin's 1977 Plan for the West Bank and Gaza Strip.

Hundred Thousand plan
Published in 1983, the "Master Plan for Settlement for Judea and Samaria, Development Plan for the Region for 1983-1986", co-authored by the Ministry of Agriculture and the Settlement Division of the World Zionist Organisation, aimed at attracting 80,000 Israelis to live in 43 new Israeli settlements (for which up to 450 km of new roads were to be paved) in order to raise the total settler population to 100,000 by 2010.

In late 1984, some embarrassment was caused when the Israeli settlement of Ariel in the West Bank paired itself as a sister city with Bisho, the capital of the ostensibly independent Bantustan of Ciskei. Shortly afterwards, Shimon Peres, the new Prime Minister of a Labour-Likud national coalition government, condemned apartheid as an "idiotic system".

Intifada (1987 to 1991)

In 1984 elections, Labor and Likud, on opposite sides of the debate over territorial compromise, were forced into coalition and any thought of land for peace tabled. In the 1980s, Sharon used coercive measures to control the population such as curfews, destruction of homes and the uprooting of trees, a policy reaffirmed in 1985 by Yitzhak Rabin. These Israeli settlements constituted a "creeping de facto annexation" that fed Palestinian discontent. In 1985, the National Conference of Black Lawyers in the United States compiled a report, entitled Bantustans in the Holy Land, making the analogy with what was taking place in the West Bank. The term was much maligned at that time, but 15 years later, an American comparative law scholar and Africanist, Adrien Wing wrote that events in the ensuing decade and a half regarding the way territory was being regulated seemed to support the cogency of the analogy. By late 1987 tensions had sharpened and the Intifada began. In 1988, Jordan surrendered any claim to Palestine and the Palestinian National Council proclaimed the State of Palestine. Sharon announced the Seven Stars plan in 1991, calling for settlements on the Green Line, with the declared intention of its consequent eradication and the 1992 Meretz-Sheves plan contemplated four Palestinian cantons divided by zones of Jewish settlement and later evolved as a plan to annex all major settlement blocs along with three "autonomous Palestinian enclaves", which Catriona Drew, a professor of international law at the University of London, described as the "Bantustanization" of a "self-determination unit". The Intifada lost impetus after the Madrid Conference of 1991 that brought together Israeli and Palestinian representatives for the first time since 1949 and in 1992, Rabin pledged to halt settlement expansion and began secret talks with the PLO.

Oslo Accords

Soon after the joint signing of the Oslo I Accord on 13 September 1993, Yassir Arafat and Shimon Peres engaged in follow-up negotiations at the UNESCO summit held in December that year in Granada. Arafat was incensed at what he saw as the impossible terms rigidly set by Peres regarding Israeli control of border exits with Jordan, stating that what he was being asked to sign off on resembled a bantustan. This, Peres insisted, was what had been agreed to at Oslo. Subsequently, on 4 May 1994, Israel and the PLO signed the Gaza–Jericho Agreement that stipulated arrangements for the withdrawal of Israeli troops from both named areas. Azmi Bishara commented in 1995 that the model envisaged for Gaza was a Bantustan, one even more restrictive in its implications and scope than the ones existing in South Africa, and that Oslo was applying that model to the West Bank. This in turn was taken to signal that the same model would be applied in the future to the West Bank, as with Jericho.

These areas, composing what is known as Area A (17.7% of the West Bank) and Area B (18.3% of the West Bank), formalized the legal limitation to urban expansion of Palestinian populated areas outside of these fragments. While these arrangements were agreed at Oslo to be temporary, with the rest of the West Bank to "be gradually transferred to Palestinian jurisdiction" by 1997, no such transfers were ever made.

Oslo maps 
The Oslo map has been called the "Swiss cheese" map, in reference to the multiple holes ("eyes") in Emmental cheese. The Palestinian negotiators at Oslo were not shown the Israeli map until 24 hours before the agreement was due to be signed, and had no access to maps of their own in order to confirm what they were being shown. Yasser Arafat was quoted by Uri Savir, the Israeli chief negotiator at Oslo, as follows: "Arafat glared at [the map] in silence, then sprang out of his chair and declared it to be an insufferable humiliation. 'These are cantons! You want me to accept cantons! You want to destroy me'!"

Professor Shari Motro, then an Israeli secretary in the Oslo delegation, described in 2005 part of the story behind the maps:
Some people claim that the Oslo process was deliberately designed to segregate Palestinians into isolated enclaves so that Israel could continue to occupy the West Bank without the burden of policing its people. If so, perhaps the map inadvertently revealed what the Israeli wordsmiths worked so diligently to hide. Or perhaps Israel's negotiators purposefully emphasized the discontinuity of Palestinian areas to appease opposition from the Israeli right, knowing full well that Arafat would fly into a rage. Neither is true. I know, because I had a hand in producing the official Oslo II map, and I had no idea what I was doing. Late one night during the negotiations, my commander took me from the hotel where the talks were taking place to an army base, where he led me to a room with large fluorescent light tables and piles of maps everywhere. He handed me some dried-out markers, unfurled a map I had never seen before, and directed me to trace certain lines and shapes. Just make them clearer, he said. No cartographer was present, no graphic designer weighed in on my choices, and, when I was through, no Gilad Sher reviewed my work. No one knew it mattered.

Motro's then superior officer, Shaul Arieli, who drew and was ultimately responsible for the Oslo maps, explained that the Palestinian enclaves were created by a process of subtraction, consigning the Palestinians to those areas that the Israelis considered "unimportant":
The process was very easy. In the agreement signed in '93, all those areas that would be part of final status agreement—settlements, Jerusalem, etc.—were known. So I took out those areas, along with those roads and infrastructure that were important to Israel in the interim period. It was a new experience for me. I did not have experience of mapmaking before. I of course used many different civilian and military organizations to gather data on the infrastructure, roads, water pipes, etc. I took out what I thought important for Israel.

The islands isolate Palestinian communities from one another, while allowing them to be well guarded and easily contained by the Israeli military. The arrangements result in "inward growth" of Palestinian localities, rather than urban sprawl. Many observers, including Edward Said, Norman Finkelstein and Meron Benvenisti were highly critical of the arrangements, with Benvenisti concluding that the Palestinian self-rule sketched out in the agreements was little more than a euphemism for Bantustanization. Defenders of the agreements made in the 1990s between Israel and the PLO rebuffed criticisms that the effect produced was similar to that of South Africa's apartheid regime, by noting that, whereas the Bantustan structure was never endorsed internationally, the Oslo peace process's memorandum had been underwritten and supported by an international concert of nations, both in Europe, the Middle East and by the Russian Federation.

Netanyahu and the Wye River Accord
A subsequent Wye River Accord negotiated with Benjamin Netanyahu drew similar criticism. Israeli author Amos Elon wrote in 1996 that the idea of Palestinian independence is "anathema" to Netanyahu, and that "[t]he most he seems ready to grant the Palestinians is a form of very limited local autonomy in some two or three dozen Bantustan-style enclaves". Noam Chomsky argued that the situation envisaged still differed from the historical South African model in that Israel did not subsidize the fragmented territories it controlled, as South Africa did, leaving that to international aid donors; and secondly, despite exhortations from the business community, it had, at that period, failed to set up maquiladoras or industrial parks to exploit cheap Palestinian labor, as had South Africa with the bantustans. He did draw an analogy however between the two situations by saying that the peace negotiations had led to a corrupt elite, the Palestinian Authority, playing a role similar to that of the black leadership appointed by South Africa to administer their Bantustans. Chomsky concluded that it was in Israel's interest to agree to call these areas states.

Subsequent peace plans

2000 Camp David Summit

Talks to achieve a comprehensive resolution of the conflict were renewed at the Camp David Summit in 2000, only for them to break down. Accounts differ as to which side bore responsibility for the failure. Reports of the outcome of the summit have been described as illustrating the Rashomon effect, in which the multiple witnesses gave contradictory and self-serving interpretations.

Israel Prime Minister Ehud Barak's offer was widely reported as "generous" and, according to participant Dennis Ross would have handed control over 97% of the West Bank to Palestinians. Responding to Ross' comments, Hassan Abdel Rahman, the Palestinian representative in Washington since 1994, at a forum sponsored by the U.S. Institute for Peace, disputed this version of events.

Ehud Barak said that revisionist critics' charges that his plan offered "noncontiguous bantustans" was "one of the most embarrassing lies to have emerged from Camp David." Others were of the opinion that despite an undertaking to withdraw from most of their territory, the resulting entity would still have consisted of several bantustans. Israeli journalist Ze'ev Schiff argued that "the prospect of being able to establish a viable state was fading right before [the Palestinians] eyes. They were confronted with an intolerable set of options: to agree to the spreading occupation... or to set up wretched Bantustans, or to launch an uprising."

Former U.S. President Jimmy Carter wrote about The Clinton Parameters in his widely publicized Palestine: Peace Not Apartheid:
The best offer to the Palestinians – by Clinton, not Barak – had been to withdraw 20 percent of the settlements, covering about 10 percent of the occupied land, including land to be 'leased' and portions of the Jordan River valley and East Jerusalem. The percentage figure is misleading, since it usually includes only the actual footprints of the settlements. There is a zone with a radius of about four hundred meters around each settlement within which Palestinians cannot enter. In addition, there are other large areas that would have been taken or earmarked to be used exclusively by Israel, roadways that connect the settlements to one another and to Jerusalem, and 'life arteries' that provide the settlers with water, sewage, electricity, and communications. These range in width from five hundred to four thousand meters, and Palestinians cannot use or cross many of these connecting links. This honeycomb of settlements and their interconnection conduits effectively divide the West Bank into at least two noncontiguous areas and multiple fragments, often uninhabitable or even unreachable, and control of the Jordan River valley denies Palestinians any direct access eastward into  Jordan. About one hundred military checkpoints completely surround Palestine and block routes going into or between Palestinian communities, combined with an uncountable number of other roads that are permanently closed with large concrete cubes or mounds of earth and rocks. There was no possibility that any Palestinian leader could accept such terms and survive, but official statements from Washington and Jerusalem were successful in placing the entire onus for the failure on Yasir Arafat.

Following the breakdown of talks, Palestinian protests escalated into the Second Intifada.

Sharon, Olmert and Bush
On his election to the Israeli Prime Minister in March 2001, Ariel Sharon expressed his determination not to allow the road map for peace advanced by the first administration of George W. Bush to hinder his territorial goals, and stated that Israeli concessions at all prior negotiations were no longer valid. Several prominent Israeli analysts concluded that his plans torpedoed the diplomatic process, with some claiming that his vision of Palestinian enclaves resembled the Bantustan model. In 2002, Israel began Operation Defensive Shield and commenced the Israeli West Bank barrier, which frequently deviates from the pre-1967 ceasefire line into the West Bank.

It later emerged that in private, Sharon had confided to a foreign statesman as early as April 1999, when he was serving as Foreign Minister for the Netanyahu government, that he believed the apartheid-era Bantustan provided "an ideal solution to the dilemma of Palestinian statehood". When Massimo D'Alema recalled the discussion during which Sharon explained his preference for Bantustan-like Palestine, one of the guests, who attended a private dinner the Italian Prime Minister hosted for Israelis in late April 2003, countered by suggesting that D'Alema's recollections must be an interpretation rather than a fact. d'Alema replied that the words he gave were "a precise quotation of your prime minister." Another Israeli guest, who was present at the dinner and who was (deeply) involved in cultivating ties between Israel and South Africa, confirmed that "whenever he happened to encounter Sharon, he would be interrogated at length about the history of the protectorates and their structures." In the same year Sharon himself was forthcoming in avowing that it informed his plan to construct a "map of a (future) Palestinian state". Not only was the Gaza Strip to be reduced to a bantustan, but the model there, according to Meron Benvenisti, was to be transposed to the West Bank by ensuring, simultaneously, that the Separation Wall itself broke up into three fragmented entities: Jenin-Nablus, Bethlehem-Hebron and Ramallah.

Avi Primor in 2002 described the implications of the plan thus: "Without anyone taking notice, a process is underway establishing a 'Palestinian state' limited to the Palestinian cities, a 'state'  a number of separate, sovereign-less enclaves, with no resources for self-sustenance." In 2003, the historian Tony Judt, arguing that the peace process had effectively been killed, leaving "Palestinian Arabs corralled into shrinking Bantustans." Commenting on these plans in 2006, Elisha Efrat, Professor of urban geography at TAU argued that any state created on these fragmented divisions would be neither economically viable nor amenable to administration. In a 26 May 2005 joint press conference with Mahmoud Abbas, in the White House Rose Garden, President George W. Bush stated his expectations vis-a-vis the Roadmap Plan as follows: Any final status agreement must be reached between the two parties, and changes to the 1949 Armistice lines must be mutually agreed to. A viable two-state solution must ensure contiguity of the West Bank, and a state of scattered territories will not work. There must also be meaningful linkages between the West Bank and Gaza. This is the position of the United States today, it will be the position of the United States at the time of final status negotiations.

Sharon eventually disengaged from the Gaza in 2005, and in the ensuing years, during the Sharon-Peres interregnum and the government of Ehud Olmert it became a commonplace to speak of the result there, where Hamas assumed sole authority over the internal administration of the Strip, as the state of Hamastan, a wordplay on Bantustan and other pejorative uses of the suffix -stan to describe a place populated by Muslims. At the same time, according to Akiva Eldar, the Sharon plan to apply the same policy of creating discontinuous enclaves for Palestinians in the West Bank was implemented. In his Sadat lecture of 14 April 2005, former United States Secretary of State James Baker said that "Finally, the administration must make it unambiguously clear to Israel that while Prime Minister Sharon's planned withdrawal from Gaza is a positive initiative, it cannot be simply the first step in a unilateral process leading to the creation of Palestinian Bantustans in the West Bank". The maps for Sharon's disengagement from Gaza, Camp David and Oslo are similar to each other and to the 1967 Allon plan. By 2005, together with the Separation Wall, that area had been potted with 605 closure barriers whose overall effect was to create a "matrix of contained quadrants controllable from well-defended, fixed military positions and settlements". Olmert's Realignment plan (or convergence plan) are terms used to describe a method whereby Israel creates "facts on the ground" for a future Palestinian state of its own design as foreseen by the Allon plan.

Netanyahu and Obama

In 2016, the last year of his presidency, Barack Obama and John Kerry discussed a number of detailed maps showing the fragmentation of the Palestinian areas. Advisor Ben Rhodes said that Obama "was shocked to see how 'systematic' the Israelis had been at cutting off Palestinian population centers from one another." These findings were discussed with the Israeli government, which never disputed them. Obama's realization was reported to be the reason that he abstained on the United Nations Security Council Resolution 2334 which condemned the settlements.

According to Haaretz's Chemi Shalev, in a speech marking the 50th anniversary of the Six-Day War, "Netanyahu thus envisages not only that Palestinians in the West Bank will need Israeli permission to enter and exit their 'homeland', which was also the case for the Bantustans, but that the Israel Defense Forces (IDF) will be allowed to continue setting up roadblocks, arresting suspects and invading Palestinian homes, all in the name of 'security needs'."

In a 2016 interview, former Israeli Member of Knesset (MK) Ksenia Svetlova argued that West Bank disengagement would be very difficult and that a more likely outcome was "annexation and controlling Palestinians in Bantustans".

Trump peace plan

The 2020 Trump peace plan proposed splitting a possible "State of Palestine" into five zones:
 A reduced Gaza Strip connected by a road to two uninhabited districts in the Negev desert;
 Part of the southern West Bank;
 A central area around Ramallah, almost trisected by a number of Israeli settlements;
 A northern area including Nablus, Jenin, and Tulkarm;
 A small zone including Qalqilya, surrounded by Israeli settlements.

Palestinian President Mahmoud Abbas commented on the fragmented nature of the proposal at the United Nations Security Council, waving a picture of the fragmented cantons and stating: "This is the state that they will give us. It's like a Swiss cheese, really. Who among you will accept a similar state and similar conditions?" According to Professor Ian Lustick, the appellation "State of Palestine" applied to this archipelago of Palestinian-inhabited districts is not to be taken any more seriously than the international community took apartheid South Africa's description of the bantustans of Transkei, Bophuthatswana, Venda, and Ciskei as "independent nation-states."

When the plan emerged, Yehuda Shaul argued that the proposals were remarkably similar to the details set forth both in the 1979 Drobles Plan, written for the World Zionist Organization and entitled Master Plan for the Development of Settlements in Judea and Samaria, 1979–1983, and key elements of the earlier Allon Plan, aimed at ensuring Jewish settlement in the Palestinian territories, while blocking the possibility that a Palestinian state could ever emerge.

The plan in principle contemplates a future Palestinian state which would be, as the Financial Times describes, "shrivelled to a constellation of disconnected enclaves". A group human rights experts also sided with the opinion, saying that "what would be left of the West Bank would be a Palestinian Bantustan, islands of disconnected land completely surrounded by Israel and with no territorial connection to the outside world." Similar opinions were expressed by Daniel Levy, former Israeli negotiator and president of the U.S./Middle East Project, and the UN Special Rapporteur Michael Lynk.

Netanyahu annexation plan

Israeli Prime Minister Benjamin Netanyahu announced on 6 April 2019, three days before the Israeli elections, that he would not give up any settlement and would extend gradually Israeli sovereignty to the West Bank. Al Jazeera reported the following year that Netanyahu was expected on 1 July 2020 to announce Israel's annexation of the Jordan Valley and northern Dead Sea. In a May 2020 interview with Israel Hayom, ahead of the proposed annexation, Netanyahu explained that Palestinian enclaves in the area would remain subordinated to Israeli military control: "They will remain a Palestinian enclave... You don't need to apply sovereignty over them, they will remain Palestinian subjects if you will. But security control also applies to these places." In the event, the annexation proposal was not implemented.

According to Yuval Shany, Hersch Lauterpacht Chair in International Law at the Hebrew University of Jerusalem, Netanyahu's annexation plans violated the Oslo Accords, and the two-state solution Netanyahu had formerly accepted. The effective result of such plans would be to "effectively create(s) Palestinian enclaves in the nonannexed area with limited contiguity and almost certainly no sustainable viability as an independent state. This division of territorial control looks more like the South African system of Bantustans than the foundation of a viable two-state solution." 50 UN experts went public stating that the result would be Bantustans, with Jewish South African-Israeli writer Benjamin Pogrund, formerly opposed to the Apartheid analogy also claiming that the proposal would effectively introduce an apartheid system. A similar opinion was expressed by the Israel Democracy Institute's Professor Amichai Cohen.

Land Area

Settlements and Area C

The Allon Plan, the Drobles World Zionist Organization plan, Menachem Begin's plan, Benjamin Netanyahu's "Allon Plus" plan, the 2000 Camp David Summit, and Sharon's vision of a Palestinian state all foresaw a territory surrounded, divided, and, ultimately, controlled by Israel, as did the more recent Trump peace plan. The settlements have turned Palestinian communities into fragmented enclaves without development prospects. Settlement activity increased markedly in the Oslo years. From 1994 to 2000, the West Bank's settler population grew by 80,700 and about four hundred kilometers of roads were laid. From late 1992 until 2001, "between 71 and 102 new Jewish outposts were established." Neve Gordon argues that this activity stands in contradiction to the idea of withdrawal of Israeli sovereignty and the creation of a Palestinian state.

 1 including Sinai
 2 Janet Abu-Lughod mentions 500 settlers in Gaza in 1978 (excluding Sinai), and 1,000 in 1980.

A new Israeli government, formed on 13 June 2021, declared a "status quo" in the settlements policy. According to Peace Now, as of 28 October this has not been the case. On 24 October 2021, tenders were published for 1,355 housing units plus another 83 in Givat HaMatos and on 27 October 2021, approval was given for 3,000 housing units including in settlements deep inside the West Bank. These developments were condemned by the U.S. As well as by the United Kingdom, Russia and 12 European countries. While UN experts, Michael Lynk, Special Rapporteur on the situation of human rights in the Palestinian Territory occupied since 1967 and Mr. Balakrishnan Rajagopal (United States of America), UN Special Rapporteur on adequate housing said that settlement expansion should be treated as a "presumptive war crime".

United Nations Security Council Resolution 2334 of 2016 "Requests the Secretary-General to report to the Council every three months on the implementation of the provisions of the present resolution;" On 23 December 2021, Michael Lynk, the UN Special Rapporteur for human rights in the Palestinian territories referred to the 5 year anniversary of Resolution 2334 and said "Without decisive international intervention to impose accountability upon an unaccountable occupation, there is no hope that the Palestinian right to self-determination and an end to the conflict will be realised anytime in the foreseeable future,".

Contiguity

Successive settlement plans intended to disrupt geographical contiguity with a view to preventing the emergence of a Palestinian state. The Drobles plan made this explicit:
The purpose of settling the areas between and around the centers occupied by the minorities is to reduce to the minimum the danger of an additional Arab state being established  in these territories. Being cut off by Jewish settlements the minority population will find it difficult to form a territorial and political community.
Post-Oslo closure and separation (hafrada) policies are manifested in checkpoints, bypass roads, The Wall, and the permit system. These have resulted in the confinement, immiseration, and immobilization of the Palestinians, creating a fragmented area, a fractured society, a devastated economy, and a feeling of "isolation and abandonment". This divide and rule arrangement of fragmented Palestinian areas in weak and poor sub-communities has resulted in the erosion of urban areas, impoverishment of rural areas, the separation of families and the denial of medical care and higher education. Meron Benvenisti wrote in 2006 that the Israeli government hopes that this will result in demographic distress and emigration, but that "Palestinian society is demonstrating signs of strong cohesion and adjustment to the cruel living conditions forced on it, and there are no signs that the strategic goals have in fact been achieved."

In 2004, Colin Powell was asked what George W. Bush meant when he spoke of a "contiguous Palestine"; Powell explained that "[Bush] was making the point that you can't have a bunch of little Bantustans or the whole West Bank chopped up into noncoherent, noncontiguous pieces, and say this is an acceptable state." Rather than territorial contiguity, Sharon had in mind transportation contiguity. In 2004 Israel asked international donors to fund a new road network for Palestinians, that would run under and over the existing settler-only network. Since acceptance would have implied official approval of the settlement enterprise, the World Bank refused. While Israelis could traverse the contiguous Area C, settler-only roads divided the West Bank into a series of non-contiguous areas for Palestinians wanting to reach Areas A and B. In 2007, Special Rapporteur John Dugard wrote The number of checkpoints, including roadblocks, earth mounds and trenches, increased from 376 in August 2005 to 540 in December 2006. These checkpoints divide the West Bank into four distinct areas: the north (Nablus, Jenin and Tulkarem), the centre (Ramallah), the south (Hebron) and East Jerusalem. Within these areas further enclaves have been created by a system of checkpoints and roadblocks. Moreover highways for the use of Israelis only further fragment the Occupied Palestinian Territory into 10 small cantons or Bantustans.

The Encyclopedia of the Israeli–Palestinian Conflict says that "by August 2006 the fragmentation of the West Bank and the ability of Palestinians to move from canton to canton within it were at their nadir." Criticism of non-contiguity has continued in subsequent years. In 2008, the last year of his presidency, Bush stated that Swiss cheese wasn't going to work as an outline of a state, and that in order to be viable, a future Palestinian state must have contiguous territory. In 2020, former U.S. Ambassador to Israel, Martin Indyk, noted that the Trump Plan proposed 'transportational' contiguity instead of territorial contiguity, via "tunnels that would connect the islands of Palestinian sovereignty. Those tunnels, of course, would be under Israeli control."

Land expropriation

In 2003, Special Rapporteur on the Right to Food Jean Ziegler reported that he:

is also particularly concerned by the pattern of land confiscation, which many Israeli and Palestinian intellectuals and non-governmental organizations have suggested is inspired by an underlying strategy of "Bantustanization". The building of the security fence/apartheid wall is seen by many as a concrete manifestation of this Bantustanization as, by cutting the Occupied Palestinian Territories into five barely contiguous territorial units deprived of international borders, it threatens the potential of any future viable Palestinian State with a functioning economy to be able to realize the right to food of its own people.

The Financial Times published a 2007 U.N. map and explained: "The UN mapmakers focused on land set aside for Jewish settlements, roads reserved for settler access, the West Bank separation barrier, closed military areas and nature reserves," and "What remains is an area of habitation remarkably close to territory set aside for the Palestinian population in Israeli security proposals dating back to postwar 1967."

In a 2013 report on the Palestinian economy in East Jerusalem, UNCTAD's conclusions noted increased demolitions of Palestinian property and homes as well as settlement growth in the areas surrounding East Jerusalem and Bethlehem adding "to the existing physical fragmentation between different Palestinian 'bantustans' – drawing on South African experience of economically dependent, self-governed "homelands" existing within the orbit of the advanced metropolis,.." A 2015 report of the Norwegian Refugee Council noted the impact of Israeli policies in key areas of East Jerusalem, principally the Wall and settlement activity, particularly in regard to Givat HaMatos and Har Homa.

According to Haaretz, in November 2020, the Israeli Ministry of Transport announced a highway and transportation master plan through 2045, the first of its kind for the West Bank. Details about the plans are contained in a new report Highway to Annexation which concludes that the "West Bank road and transportation development creates facts on the ground that constitute a significant entrenchment of the de facto annexation already taking place in the West Bank and will enable massive settlement growth in the years to come."

Jerusalem

Dr. Hanna Baumann of the University of Cambridge's Centre for Urban Conflicts Research describes Jerusalem as "an enclave city par excellence". Baumann explained the similarity in Israeli policies towards Palestinian areas in East Jerusalem and the West Bank, noting that even middle-class Palestinian neighbourhoods in East Jerusalem have been disconnected from the rest of the city. A similar study published in 2006 by over 40 Palestinian, Israeli and international authors concluded that Jerusalem contains an "archipelago" of isolated Palestinian "islands", created by segregated road systems and buffer zones. Through this "spatial containment", Palestinian areas have lost agricultural land, been excluded from Israeli life, and been prohibited from expanding outside of previously established built-up areas. This arrangement has been imposed via a series of Israeli government Jerusalem Master Plans since 1967, which have set the urban planning policies for the maintenance of a Jewish majority and cultural hegemony in the city. Other scholars have published similar assessments of the Palestinian enclaves in Jerusalem, including Michael Dumper, Professor of Middle East politics at the University of Exeter and Salem Thawaba and Hussein Al-Rimmawi, Associate Professors at Birzeit University.

See also
 Media coverage of the Arab–Israeli conflict

Notes

Citations

Sources

 Also at Google books.

 (also in Hebrew: ראש הממשלה בראיון מיוחד ל"ישראל היום": "לא אנחנו נוותר, אלא הפלשתינים")

 Overview section also published publicly at ResearchGate

 Also available at https://scholarship.richmond.edu/cgi/viewcontent.cgi?article=1350&context=law-faculty-publications

External links
 The Writing is on the Wall Annexation Past and Present
 Conquer and Divide

Human rights abuses in the State of Palestine
Israeli–Palestinian peace process
West Bank

he:תוכנית הקנטונים